Sultanpur is a village in the Nakashipara CD block in the Krishnanagar Sadar subdivision of the Nadia district in the state of West Bengal, India.

Demographics 
According to the 2011 Census of India, Sultanpur had a total population of 1,733, of which 886 were males and 847 were females. Population in the age range 0–6 years was 229.

References 

Villages in Nadia district